Mélissa Plaza (born 28 July 1988 in Saint-Gaudens) is a French football player who last played for EA Guingamp of the Division 1 Féminine. She plays as a defensive midfielder. Plaza is a former women's youth international having played with the under-20 team at the 2008 FIFA U-20 Women's World Cup and is a currently a member of the senior team making her debut in 2009. She also played with the France team at 2009 Summer Universiade Games where she netted two goals.

Club statistics

References

External links
 Montpellier player profile
 
 
 France player profile 
 
 footofeminin player profile

1988 births
Living people
French women's footballers
French people of Spanish descent
Montpellier HSC (women) players
Olympique Lyonnais Féminin players
France women's international footballers
Division 1 Féminine players
Women's association football midfielders
En Avant Guingamp (women) players